Team Volleyball Manila (originally, Team Volleyball Madness) is a professional volleyball team in the Philippines playing in various tournaments, including the Spikers' Turf (previously with the Premier Volleyball League) and Philippine Superliga (PSL).

History

The team debuted in the Philippine Superliga (PSL) as the Systema Active Smashers (under the sponsorship of Peerless Products Manufacturing Corporation), playing as one of the pioneer teams in the men's division. The team also participated in the inaugural men's conference of the Shakey's V-League (the precursor of the Spikers' Turf). In 2015, the team was renamed the Champion Infinity Active Smashers and became one of the pioneer teams of the Spikers' Turf, the male counterpart of the Shakey's V-League.

In September 2015, Sta. Elena Construction & Development Corporation took over sponsorship of the team and played as the Sta. Elena Construction Wrecking Balls. In October 2016, the team was renamed the Champion Supra Smashers with the return of Peerless Products Manufacturing Corporation as its sponsor.

In 2017, Sta. Elena Construction & Development Corporation returned as its sponsor.

Name changes
Original name:
Team Volleyball Madness / Team Volleyball Manila (original name, 2013–present) 
Sponsored names:
TVM-Systema / Systema Active Smashers (2013-2014)  
BENCH/ Systema Active Smashers (2014)   
Champion Infinity Active Smashers (2015)  
Champion Supra Smashers (2016)  
Sta. Elena Construction Wrecking Balls (2015-2016, 2017–2018)  
Sta. Elena Ball Hammers (2018–2019)  

NU-Sta. Elena Nationals (2022-present)

Current roster

Coaching staff
 Head coach: Dante Alinsunurin
 Assistant coach: Dong dela Cruz Jessie Lopez

Team Staff
 Team Manager:
 Team Utility: 

Medical Staff
 Team Physician:
 Physical Therapist:

Previous roster
For the 2018 Spikers’ Turf Open Conference:

Coaching staff
 Head coach: Dante Alinsunurin
 Assistant coach: Dong dela Cruz Jessie Lopez

Team Staff
 Team Manager:
 Team Utility: 

Medical Staff
 Team Physician:
 Physical Therapist:

For Premier Volleyball League 1st Season Reinforced Open Conference:

Coaching staff
 Head coach: Arnold Laniog
 Assistant coach(s): Ariel dela Cruz

Team Staff
 Team Manager: Sammy Gaddi
 Team Utility: 

Medical Staff
 Team Physician:
 Physical Therapist: Mikko Gakko

For Spikers' Turf 2016 Reinforced Conference:

Coaching staff
 Head coach: Arnold Laniog
 Assistant coach(s): Jhay-r Libay

Team Staff
 Team Manager: Sammy Gaddi
 Team Utility: 

Medical Staff
 Team Physician:
 Physical Therapist: Mikko Gakko

For Spikers' Turf 2016 Open Conference:

Coaching staff
 Head coach: Arnold Laniog
 Assistant coach(s): Jhay-r Libay

Team Staff
 Team Manager: Sammy Gaddi
 Team Utility: 

Medical Staff
 Team Physician:
 Physical Therapist: Mikko Gakko

For Spikers' Turf 2015 Third Conference:

Coaching staff
 Head coach: Arnold Laniog
 Assistant coach(s): Jhay-r Libay

Team Staff
 Team Manager: Sammy Gaddi
 Team Utility: 

Medical Staff
 Team Physician:
 Physical Therapist: Mikko Gakko

For Spikers' Turf 2015 First Conference:

Coaching staff
 Head coach: Arnold Laniog
 Assistant coach(s): Jhay-r Libay

Team Staff
 Team Manager: Sammy Gaddi
 Team Utility: 

Medical Staff
 Team Physician:
 Physical Therapist: Mikko Gakko

For the 2016 PSL Beach Volleyball Challenge Cup:

For the 2015 PSL Beach Volleyball Challenge Cup:

Coaching staff
 Head coach:
 Assistant coach(s):

Team Staff
 Team Manager:
 Team Utility: 

Medical Staff
 Team Physician:
 Physical Therapist:

For the 2014 PSL Grand Prix Conference:

Coaching staff
 Head coach: Arnold Laniog
 Assistant coach(s): Jhay-r Libay Ian Fernandez

Team Staff
 Team Manager: Sammy Gaddi
 Team Utility: 

Medical Staff
 Team Physician:
 Physical Therapist: Mikko Gakko

Honors

Team
Premier Volleyball League/Spikers' Turf:

Philippine Super Liga:

NOTE: Played as Team Volleyball Manila (TVM).

Others:

Individual
Spikers' Turf / Premier Volleyball League:

Philippine Super Liga:

Others:

Team captains
  Renz Ordoñez (2013)
  AJ Pareja (2014)
  Chris Macasaet (2014 - 2014)
  Sylvester Honrade (2015- 2016)
  Jan Berlin Paglinawan (2016 – 2017)
  Francis Philip C. Saura (2018)
  Edward Camposano (2019)
  James Martin Nativdad (2019)
  Ave Joshua Retamar (2022)

References

External links
 PSL-Systema Active Smashers Page
2013 Philippine Super Liga Grand Prix Final Results
Santa Elena reaffirms long-term support for PVL

Philippine Super Liga
Shakey's V-League
Spikers' Turf
2013 establishments in the Philippines
Volleyball clubs established in 2013
Men's volleyball teams in the Philippines